Crimsonland is a top-down dual stick arena shooter video game with role-playing elements. It was developed by Finnish studio 10tons Entertainment and published by Reflexive Entertainment in 2003. In 2014 a re-release through digital distribution followed.

Gameplay 
The player is placed in the middle of the map while enemies gradually enter and make their way towards the player. The player has to eliminate the enemies before their health reaches zero. With each death of an enemy the player will gain experience points. Each level the player gains, the player can select special perks that range anywhere from faster reload times, faster shooting speed, faster movement, to status effects like radiation (creating an area of affect around the player that damages all enemies within its range), poison bullets, and many others. Randomly, when an enemy is killed they will drop a bonus that may be extra points, temporary invulnerability, fire bullets, slowing of time, and many others.

The game also offers local multiplayer for two players on the original and up to 4 on the re-release. In a multiplayer game, all players share the same experience and perks but are free to pick up any weapon or bonuses that may appear.

Game modes 
The game features four game modes. There is a secret bonus mode (puzzle mode), developers never said if completing the puzzle led to something.

Quest mode
The player has to complete 50 levels each with their own starting weapons and enemy layouts. As the player completes each quest they unlock weapons and perks.

Survival mode
The player tries to survive as long as they can as waves of enemies come after them. All perks and weapons that have been unlocked are available.

Rush mode
The player is equipped with the AK47 and has to survive as long as they can without any perks or bonuses.

Typ’o’Shooter
The player remains stationary in the middle of the map and is equipped with a shotgun. As the enemies make their way towards the player there is a word hovering over them. In order to shoot at the specific enemy the player needs to type out the word and press Enter. The longer the player survives the longer the words that appear over the enemies.

2014 re-release game modes 
With the re-release of Crimsonland in 2014, new game modes were added.

Quest
The player has to complete 60 levels each with their own specific goals and weapons. While the main goal is to eliminate all the enemies, how that goal is accomplished is different. Many quests do not give the player the option of picking up alternate weapons. Also, perks can be disabled in the game's options screen to add even more difficulty. There are three levels of difficulty that the player can select from and if the player completes a quest with full health, a star will be marked on the quest in the quest selection screen.
The quest mode is where the player unlocks most of the game's weapons and perks.

Survival
The player has to survive as long as they can while wave after wave of enemies appear at an increasing rate. All perks, weapons, and bonuses that have been unlocked are available in this game mode.

Rush
The player is equipped with the AK47 rifle as monsters and spiders make their way towards the player from the left and right sides of the screen respectively. This mode does not have perks or bonuses.

Nukefism
The player does not have a weapon in this game mode. Instead, the player needs to pick up bonuses to eliminate the enemies. This mode does not have perks or any point-based bonuses.

Weapon Picker
The player only has the bullets found in the weapon they picks up, there are no reloads. Weapons are randomly dropped throughout the map.

Blitz
Like survival mode but everything is increased. The monster count is increased to make the play time much shorter than in Survival mode. All perks, weapons, and bonuses that have been unlocked are available in this game mode.

Gembine
Gembine is a hidden game within Crimsonland. The game is very similar to the puzzle game 2048. The player is presented with a 4x4 grid and using the arrow keys, the goal is the combine the gems to create larger gems. With each combination of a gem, the player receives points. To play the game, the credits from the main menu have to be selected and typed as "gembine" with the keyboard, or if using a controller press on the right d-pad up up up left left left up. (For PlayStation controllers press "triangle" (three times) then "square" (three times) and finally "triangle" once.) (For an Xbox controller press "Y" (three times) then "X" (three times) and finally "Y" once.)

Development 
Originally developed by 10tons Entertainment and released as freeware/demo version, in 2003 a commercial shareware version with publisher Reflexive Entertainment followed. The game was re-released and self-published through digital distribution in 2014 with updates to graphics, perks, weapons, enemies, and game modes. In 2015 it was released for the Xbox One. On November 24, 2017, the game was released on Nintendo Switch.

Reception 
The general reception has been fairly positive. On Steam, the user reviews have Crimsonland rated as "Very Positive" and a 4.5 out of 5 from TouchArcade. IGN gave Crimsonland a 7.5 out of 10. Meanwhile, Metacritic has Crimsonland at 68 for PC and 64 on the PlayStation 4 and PlayStation Vita.

References

External links 
 
 

Windows games
2003 video games
Video games developed in Finland
Steam Greenlight games
Top-down video games
PlayStation 3 games
PlayStation 4 games
PlayStation 5 games
PlayStation Vita games
Shoot 'em ups
MacOS games
Linux games
Android (operating system) games
Windows Phone games
Xbox One games
Nintendo Switch games
10tons Entertainment games
Cooperative video games
Reflexive Entertainment games